Tygwyn railway station is located at a level crossing on the A496 between Harlech and Talsarnau near the estuary of the Afon Dwyryd in Gwynedd, Wales.

History

British Rail requested the permission of the Secretary of State for Transport to close Tygwyn and three other Cambrian Coast stations (namely Abererch, Llandecwyn and Tonfanau) during the mid-1990s. Their winter 1995/96 timetable featured only two northbound and three southbound trains Mondays to Saturdays, with a note that the service may be withdrawn before 1 June 1996. The closure plans were eventually dropped and the station remains open today with a much improved service (all but one northbound train is scheduled to call (on request) in the summer 2016 timetable).

Services
The station remains as an unstaffed halt on the Cambrian Coast Railway with passenger services to Porthmadog, Pwllheli, Barmouth, Machynlleth and Shrewsbury. Most trains call only on request. Trains arrive roughly every two hours.

On Mondays to Fridays, there are:

 8 trains to Pwllheli.
 6 trains to Birmingham International.
 1 train to Shrewsbury.
 1 train to Machynlleth.

On Saturdays, there are:

 8 trains to Pwllheli.
 5 trains to Birmingham International.
 1 train to Shrewsbury.
 1 train to Birmingham New Street.
 1 train to Machynlleth.

On summer Sundays, there are three departures in each direction. This drops to just one departure each way in the winter.

References

External links

 RAILSCOT on Aberystwith and Welsh Coast Railway

Railway stations in Gwynedd
DfT Category F2 stations
Former Great Western Railway stations
Railway stations in Great Britain opened in 1927
Railway stations served by Transport for Wales Rail
Railway request stops in Great Britain
Talsarnau